Alexandra of Glucksburg may refer to:

Alexandra of Denmark (1844–1925), consort of King Edward VII of the United Kingdom
Princess Alexandra Victoria of Schleswig-Holstein-Sonderburg-Glücksburg (1887–1957), wife of Prince August Wilhelm of Prussia
Alexandra of Yugoslavia (1921–1993), consort of King Peter II of Yugoslavia